Kwena Dam is a combined gravity and arch type dam located on the Crocodile River, near Lydenburg, Mpumalanga, South Africa. It was established in 1984 and it serves mainly for irrigation purposes. The hazard potential of the dam has been ranked high.

See also
List of reservoirs and dams in South Africa

References 

 List of South African Dams from the Department of Water Affairs

Dams in South Africa
Dams completed in 1987